Hiroshi Moriya is a Japanese politician who is a member of the House of Councillors of Japan.

Biography 
He graduated from Hokkaido University of Education and worked at Himawari Kindergarten. In 1999, he was elected in Yamanashi PRefectural Assemlby for 4 terms, serving as chair for 2 years.. From 2008 to 2010, he was chair of the Yamanashi Prefectural Assembly. He ran in 2013, defeating incumbent  Harunobu Yonenaga and former House of Representatives member Takehiro Sakaguchi.

References 

Living people
Members of the House of Councillors (Japan)
1957 births
Liberal Democratic Party (Japan) politicians
Hokkaido University alumni